Sharon Liese is an American producer, director, and screenwriter. She created the true crime series Pink Collar Crimes and developed the show with Jon Kroll at CBS Studios. They planned to shop it out to various networks; however, CBS purchased the rights prior to any pitch being made.

Liese is also the creator of the 2008 documentary series High School Confidential which appeared on We TV. The series followed teenage girls at Blue Valley Northwest High School and documented their lives.

She directed the 2015 documentary The Gnomist which was later purchased by CNN Films. It appeared at the Tribeca Film Festival and won "Best Documentary" at the LA Shorts Fest. Her production company, Herizon Productions, based in Overland Park, Kansas, was founded in 2002.

See also
 List of female film and television directors
 List of LGBT-related films directed by women

References

External links 
 
 

Living people
American women film directors
American women film producers
American women screenwriters
American women television producers
People from Overland Park, Kansas
Year of birth missing (living people)
21st-century American women